is a Prefectural Natural Park in Western Tokyo, Japan. Established in 1950, the park's central feature is Mount Taki, to the south of the confluence of the Tama and  Rivers. The park is celebrated for its views over the Kantō Plain.

See also
 National Parks of Japan
 Parks and gardens in Tokyo
 Meiji no Mori Takao Quasi-National Park

References

Parks and gardens in Tokyo
Protected areas established in 1950
1950 establishments in Japan